The Diary of Anne Frank is a 1959 biographical drama film based on the Pulitzer Prize-winning 1955 play of the same name, which was in turn based on the posthumously published diary of Anne Frank, a German-born Jewish girl who lived in hiding in Amsterdam with her family during World War II. It was directed by George Stevens, with a screenplay by Frances Goodrich and Albert Hackett, is the first film version of both the play and the original story, and features three members of the original Broadway cast.

All Frank's writings to her diary were addressed as "Dear Kitty". It was published after the end of the war by her father, Otto Frank (played in the film by Joseph Schildkraut, who was also Jewish). His entire family had died during the Holocaust. The film was shot on a sound stage duplicate of the factory in Los Angeles, while exteriors were filmed at the actual building in Amsterdam.

The film was positively received by critics, currently holding a 80% critics rating on Rotten Tomatoes. It won three Academy Awards in 1960, including Best Supporting Actress for Shelley Winters. Shelley Winters later donated her Oscar to the Anne Frank Museum. In 2006, it was honored as the eighteenth most inspiring American film on the list AFI's 100 Years…100 Cheers.

Plot

In 1945, as a truckload of war survivors stops in front of an Amsterdam factory at the end of World War II, Otto Frank (Joseph Schildkraut) gets out and walks inside. After climbing the stairs to a deserted garret, Otto finds a girl's discarded glove and sobs, then is joined and comforted by Miep (Dodie Heath) and Mr. Kraler (Douglas Spencer), office workers who shielded him from the Nazis. After stating that he is now all alone, Otto begins to search for the diary written by his youngest daughter, Anne. Miep promptly retrieves it for him and he receives solace reading the words written by Anne three years earlier.

The action moves back to July 1942, and Anne (Millie Perkins) begins by chronicling the restrictions placed upon Jews that drove the Franks into hiding over the spice factory. Sharing the Franks' hiding place are the Van Daans (Lou Jacobi and Shelley Winters) and their teenage son, Peter (Richard Beymer). Kraler, who works in the office below, and Miep, his assistant, have arranged the hideaway and warn the families that they must maintain strict silence during daylight hours while the workers are there. On the first day, the minutes drag by in silence. After work, Kraler delivers food and a box for Anne compiled by Otto, which contains her beloved photos of movie stars and a blank diary. In the first pages of the diary, she describes the strangeness of never being able to go outside or breathe fresh air. She states that everybody is good at heart.

As the months pass, Anne's irrepressible energy reasserts itself and she constantly teases Peter, whose only attachment is to his cat, Moushie. Isolated from the world outside, Otto schools Anne and her sister, Margot (Diane Baker), as the sounds of sirens and bombers frequently fill the air. Mrs. Van Daan passes the time by recounting fond memories of her youth and stroking her one remaining possession, the fur coat given to her by her father. The strain of confinement causes the Van Daans to argue and pits the strong-willed Anne against her mother, Edith Frank (Gusti Huber). One day, Kraler brings a radio to the attic, providing the families with ears onto the world. Soon after, he asks them to take in another person, a Jewish dentist named Albert Dussell (Ed Wynn). When Van Daan complains that the addition will diminish their food supply, Dussell recounts the dire conditions outside, in which Jews suddenly disappear and are shipped to concentration camps. When Dussell confirms the disappearance of many of their friends, the families' hopes are dimmed.

One night, Anne dreams of seeing one of her friends in a concentration camp and wakes up screaming. In October 1942, news comes of the Allied landing in Africa but the bombing of Amsterdam intensifies, fraying the refugees' already ragged nerves. During Hanukkah, Margot longingly recalls past celebrations and Anne produces little presents for everyone. When Van Daan abruptly announces that Peter must get rid of Moucshi because he consumes too much food, Anne protests. Their argument is cut short when they hear a prowler break in the front door and the room falls silent. Peter then sends an object crashing to the floor while trying to catch Moushie, and the startled thief grabs a typewriter and flees. A watchman notices the break-in and summons two police officers, who search the premises, shining their flashlights onto the bookcase that conceals the attic entrance. The families wait in terror until Moushie knocks a plate from the table and mews, reassuring the officers that the noise was caused by a common cat. After they leave, Otto, hoping to foster faith and courage, leads everyone in a Hanukkah song.

In January 1944, Anne, on the threshold of womanhood, begins to attract Peter's attention. When Miep brings the group a cake, Dussell and Van Daan bicker over the size of their portions and Van Daan asks Miep to sell Petronella's fur coat so that he can buy cigarettes. After Kraler warns that one of his employees asked for a raise and implied that something strange is going on in the attic, Dussell dourly comments that it is just a matter of time before they are discovered. Anne, distraught, blames the adults for the war which has destroyed all sense of hope and ideals. When she storms out of the room, Peter follows and comforts her. Later, Anne confides her dreams of becoming a writer and Peter voices frustration about his inability to join the war effort. In April 1944, amid talk of liberation, the Franks watch helplessly as more Jews are marched through the streets. Tensions mount, and when Van Daan tries to steal some bread from the others, Edith denounces him and orders him to leave. As Dussell and Mrs. Van Daan quarrel over food, word comes over the radio of the Normandy invasion and Mr. Van Daan breaks into tears of shame. Heartened by the news, everyone apologizes for their harsh words, and Anne dreams of being back in school by the fall (autumn).

By July 1944, the invasion has bogged down and Kraler is hospitalized with ulcers. Upon hearing that the police have found the stolen typewriter, Anne writes that her diary provides her with a way to go on living after her death. After the Van Daans begin to quarrel once more, Peter declares that he cannot tolerate the situation and Anne soothes him by reminding him of the goodness of those who have come to their aid. Their conversation is interrupted by the sirens of an approaching police truck. As Anne and Peter bravely stand arm in arm, certain of their impending arrest, they passionately kiss. As the German uniformed police break down the bookcase entrance to the hideout, Otto declares they no longer have to live in fear, but can go forward in hope.

The film returns to 1945 as Otto tells Miep and Kraler that on his long journey home after his release from the concentration camp he learned how Edith, Margot, the Van Daans, and Dussell perished, but always held out hope that perhaps Anne had somehow survived. He sadly reveals that only the previous day in Rotterdam he met a woman who had been in Bergen-Belsen with Anne and confirmed her death. He then glances at Anne's diary and reads, "In spite of everything, I still believe that people are really good at heart," and reflects upon her unshakeable optimism.

Cast
 Millie Perkins as Anne Frank
 Joseph Schildkraut as Otto Frank (reprising his stage role)
 Shelley Winters as Petronella van Daan
 Richard Beymer as Peter van Daan
 Gusti Huber as Edith Frank (reprising her stage role)
 Lou Jacobi as Hans van Daan (reprising his stage role)
 Diane Baker as Margot Frank
 Douglas Spencer as Mr. Kraler
 Dodie Heath as Miep (credited as Dody Heath)
 Ed Wynn as Albert Dussel
 Orangey as Mouschi

Otto Frank wrote to Audrey Hepburn, asking her if she would play the part of his daughter Anne. He told Hepburn that his daughter would have been honoured to have such a famous Hollywood actress play her on film, and he also noted the striking resemblance that existed between Anne and Hepburn when she was an adolescent. She was initially interested in the role, and her name appears on the back cover of copies of the diary printed and sold to promote the "upcoming film".

During the casting period, Hepburn ultimately wrote back declining the offer, saying she felt she was too old, and lacked the skills to portray Anne. She said she was greatly honoured to have been given the choice, and noted the similarity between her own war experience and that of the Franks and the others in the annex. Hepburn and Anne were born within a month of each other in May and June 1929, and both spent their adolescences in Nazi-occupied Holland. The role went to American newcomer Millie Perkins.

Production

The film is an adaptation of the successful Broadway play based on Anne Frank's diary, which was first published in English in 1952. At the time of the film's production, the book had already sold millions of copies around the world.

According to a 1955 article published on the Daily Variety, Garson Kanin, who had staged the Broadway play, and Milton Sperling from Warner Bros. had intended to acquire the film rights, but ultimately they were sold to Buddy Adler of Twentieth Century Fox. Originally, William Wyler was in talks to direct before George Stevens signed on as producer and director.

Principal photography took place from 5 March to 11 August 1958, with additional scenes shot in November. Location work was done in Amsterdam, while the set of the annex was constructed at the 20th Century Fox Studios in Los Angeles. George Stevens initially resisted the idea of shooting the film in CinemaScope because he thought that this format would not convey the claustrophobic effect he wanted to reproduce. When Spyros Skouras, president of Twentieth Century Fox, insisted on CinemaScope, Stevens and cinematographer William C. Mellor decided to reduce the space by limiting the action to the center of the screen. Mellor further developed the look of the film by using fluorescent tubes, filters and gas rather than traditional studio lighting.

Premiere
The film premiered March 18, 1959, at the Palace Theatre in New York City.

Reception

Critical reception

The film was mostly positively received by critics, currently holding an 80% critics rating on Rotten Tomatoes based on twenty reviews.

The film holds a 59% on Metacritic, indicating mixed to positive reviews.

Accolades

 The American Film Institute included the film as No. 18 in its list of the most inspiring movies, AFI's 100 Years... 100 Cheers.
 In 1975, Shelley Winters donated her Academy Award for Best Supporting Actress statuette to the Anne Frank House in Amsterdam where it is on display.

Home media
The film was first released on DVD on February 3, 2004. The special features included some of the following; "The Diary of Anne Frank: Echoes From the Past" featurette, a press conference with director George Stevens, MovieTone news announcing public appearances by Millie Perkins, a screen test, and an audio commentary by Millie Perkins and George Stevens Jr, the director's son.

A fiftieth-anniversary edition of the film was released on DVD and Blu-ray on June 16, 2009, three months after its actual release anniversary, in commemoration of what would have been Anne Frank's 80th birthday. It included seven major new featurettes: three cast interviews, a behind-the scenes look at the score, two short documentaries about George Stevens' memories from the war and the history of the diary, and a perspective piece on the film's legacy by Thomas Rothman.

The Blu-ray was released only a month before Tony van Renterghem died on July 19, 2009. Renterghem, a Dutch cinematographer and technical, historical and script adviser who worked with Stevens for many years, consulted on both the play and the film. While his work was almost entirely behind the scenes, his knowledge helped in putting together the historical featurettes.

See also
 List of American films of 1959
 List of Holocaust films

References

External links

 
 
 
 
 

1959 films
1950s biographical drama films
20th Century Fox films
American biographical drama films
American black-and-white films
Films featuring a Best Supporting Actress Academy Award-winning performance
Films based on biographies
Films based on multiple works
Films about Anne Frank
Films directed by George Stevens
Films set in the 1940s
Films set in the Netherlands
Films set in Germany
Films whose art director won the Best Art Direction Academy Award
Films whose cinematographer won the Best Cinematography Academy Award
Films set in Amsterdam
Films scored by Alfred Newman
Holocaust films
Films based on diaries
Films based on adaptations
1959 drama films
Films shot in Amsterdam
Films shot in Los Angeles
CinemaScope films
1950s English-language films
1950s American films